Druid is a hamlet in Winslow Rural Municipality No. 319, Saskatchewan, Canada. It previously held the status of a village until December 31, 1953.

History
Prior to December 31, 1953, Druid was incorporated as a village, and was restructured as a hamlet under the jurisdiction of the Rural municipality of Winslow on that date.

See also

List of communities in Saskatchewan
Hamlets of Saskatchewan

References

Winslow No. 319, Saskatchewan
Former villages in Saskatchewan
Unincorporated communities in Saskatchewan
Division No. 13, Saskatchewan